The Nobel Prize in Chemistry is awarded annually by the Royal Swedish Academy of Sciences to scientists in the various fields of chemistry. It is one of the five Nobel Prizes established by the 1895 will of Alfred Nobel, who died in 1896.  These prizes are awarded for outstanding contributions in chemistry, physics, literature, peace, and physiology or medicine. As dictated by Nobel's will, the award is administered by the Nobel Foundation and awarded by the Royal Swedish Academy of Sciences. The first Nobel Prize in Chemistry was awarded in 1901 to Jacobus Henricus van 't Hoff, of the Netherlands. Each recipient receives a medal, a diploma and a monetary award prize that has varied throughout the years. In 1901, van 't Hoff received 150,782 SEK, which is equal to 7,731,004 SEK in December 2007.  The award is presented in Stockholm at an annual ceremony on 10 December, the anniversary of Nobel's death.

At least 25 laureates have received the Nobel Prize for contributions in the field of organic chemistry, more than any other field of chemistry. Two Nobel Prize laureates in Chemistry, Germans Richard Kuhn (1938) and Adolf Butenandt (1939), were not allowed by their government to accept the prize. They would later receive a medal and diploma, but not the money. Frederick Sanger is one out of three laureates to be awarded the Nobel Prize twice in the same subject, in 1958 and 1980. John Bardeen, who was awarded the Nobel Prize in Physics in 1956 and 1972, and Karl Barry Sharpless, who won the Nobel Prize for Chemistry in 2001 and 2022, are the others. Two others have won Nobel Prizes twice, one in chemistry and one in another subject: Maria Skłodowska-Curie (physics in 1903, chemistry in 1911) and Linus Pauling (chemistry in 1954, peace in 1962). As of 2022, the prize has been awarded to 189 individuals, including eight women: Maria Skłodowska-Curie, Irène Joliot-Curie (1935), Dorothy Hodgkin (1964), Ada Yonath (2009), Frances Arnold (2018), Emmanuelle Charpentier (2020), Jennifer Doudna (2020) and Carolyn R. Bertozzi (2022).

There have been eight years for which the Nobel Prize in Chemistry was not awarded (1916, 1917, 1919, 1924, 1933, 1940-42). There were also nine years for which the Nobel Prize in Chemistry was delayed for one year. The Prize was not awarded in 1914, as the Nobel Committee for Chemistry  decided that none of that year's nominations met the necessary criteria, but was awarded to Theodore William Richards in 1915 and counted as the 1914 prize. This precedent was followed for the 1918 prize awarded to Fritz Haber in 1919, the 1920 prize awarded to Walther Nernst in 1921, the 1921 prize awarded to Frederick Soddy in 1922, the 1925 prize awarded to Richard Zsigmondy in 1926, the 1927 prize awarded to Heinrich Otto Wieland in 1928, the 1938 prize awarded to Richard Kuhn in 1939, the 1943 prize awarded to George de Hevesy in 1944, and the 1944 prize awarded to Otto Hahn in 1945.

In 2020, Ioannidis et al. reported that half of the Nobel Prizes for science awarded between 1995-2017 were clustered in just a few disciplines within their broader fields. Atomic physics, particle physics, cell biology, and neuroscience dominated the two subjects outside chemistry, while molecular chemistry was the chief prize-winning discipline in its domain. Molecular chemists won 5.3% of all science Nobel Prizes during this period.

Laureates

See also 
 Timeline of chemistry

References

Notes 

A. The form and spelling of the names in the name column is according to nobelprize.org, the official website of the Nobel Foundation. Alternative spellings and name forms, where they exist, are given at the articles linked from this column. Where available, an image of each Nobel laureate is provided. For the official pictures provided by the Nobel Foundation, see the pages for each Nobel laureate at nobelprize.org.

B. The information in the country column is according to nobelprize.org, the official website of the Nobel Foundation. This information may not necessarily reflect the recipient's birthplace or citizenship.

C. The citation for each award is quoted (not always in full) from nobelprize.org, the official website of the Nobel Foundation. The links in this column are to articles (or sections of articles) on the history and areas of chemistry for which the awards were presented. The links are intended only as a guide and explanation. For a full account of the work done by each Nobel laureate, please see the biography articles linked from the name column.

Citations

Sources

External links 

 Official website of the Royal Swedish Academy of Sciences
 Official website of the Nobel Foundation
 (List of) Nobel Laureates and research affiliations at NobelPrize.org

Chemistry